José Gabriel Funes, S.J. (born January 31, 1963 in Córdoba) is an Argentine Jesuit priest and astronomer. He was the Director of the Vatican Observatory from August 19, 2006 until September 18, 2015, when he was succeeded by Pope Francis's appointment of the Reverend Brother Guy Consolmagno, S.J. Funes serves on the Advisory Council of METI (Messaging Extraterrestrial Intelligence).

Biography
He has a master's degree in Astronomy from the Universidad Nacional de Córdoba in Argentina and a doctorate from the University of Padua in Italy. He also has a bachelor's degree in philosophy from University del Salvador in Argentina and a bachelor's degree in theology from Pontifical Gregorian University in Rome. A member of the Society of Jesus, he was ordained a priest in 1995. He joined the Vatican Observatory as a researcher in 2000, and was named its director on August 19, 2006 replacing Fr. George Coyne.

Selected Papers 
Funes has published approximately 30 refereed papers, mostly on the morphology and dynamics of galaxies.

Extraterrestrials  

In an interview in May 2008
he stated that the possible existence of intelligent extraterrestrials did not contradict church teaching
and ruling out the existence of aliens would be like "putting limits" on God's creative freedom.
He has speculated that such alien life forms could even be “free from Original Sin ... [remaining] in full friendship with their creator.”

See also

List of Jesuit scientists
List of Roman Catholic scientist-clerics

References

External links

1963 births
Argentine Jesuits
20th-century Argentine astronomers
Living people
University of Padua alumni
Pontifical Gregorian University alumni
Jesuit scientists
People from Córdoba, Argentina
21st-century Argentine astronomers